is a single by Japanese boy band Kanjani Eight. It was released on September 5, 2012. It debuted in number one on the weekly Oricon Singles Chart and reached number one on the Billboard Japan Hot 100.

References 

2012 singles
2012 songs
Japanese-language songs
Kanjani Eight songs
Oricon Weekly number-one singles
Billboard Japan Hot 100 number-one singles
Song articles with missing songwriters